Halldórsson is a surname of Icelandic origin, meaning son of Halldór. In Icelandic names, the name is not strictly a surname, but a patronymic. Notable people with the name include:
Björgvin Halldórsson (born 1951), Icelandic pop singer
Hannes Þór Halldórsson (born 1984), Icelandic football player
Haukur Halldórsson (born 1939), Icelandic painter
Jón Halldórsson (bishop) (1275–1339), Norwegian-born Icelandic Roman Catholic clergyman; Bishop of Iceland 1322–39
Óskar Halldórsson (1921–1983), Icelandic scholar of Icelandic sagas

Icelandic-language surnames